The Pan American Women's Junior Handball Championship was the official competition for junior women's national handball teams of the Americas, and took place every two years. In addition to crowning the Pan American champions, the tournament also served as a qualifying tournament for the IHF Junior World Handball Championship. In 2018, the PATHF was deprived of recognition and the tournament was replaced with the North American & Caribbean and South and Central American Women's Junior Handball Championships.

Summary

Medal table

Participating nations

References

External links
 www.panamhandball.org

 
Recurring sporting events disestablished in 2018
Recurring sporting events established in 1993
Pan-American Team Handball Federation competitions